Coleophora inermis is a moth of the family Coleophoridae. It is found in Mongolia.

References

External links
 Moths of Mongolia on iNaturalist

inermis
Moths described in 1977
Moths of Asia